Rolf Osterwald, better known as Hazy Osterwald (February 18, 1922 in Bern – February 26, 2012 in Lucerne) was a Swiss jazz bandleader, trumpeter, and vibraphonist.

Osterwald began his career as a pianist. He arranged for Fred Böhler in the late 1930s and joined him as a trumpeter in 1941; around this time he also worked with Edmond Cohanier, Philippe Brun, Bob Huber, Eddie Brunner and Teddy Stauffer. He led his own ensemble starting in 1944, recording through the 1970s, with sidemen including Ernst Höllerhagen and Werner Dies. In the late 1940s he recorded with Gil Cuppini and played at the Paris Jazz Fair with Sidney Bechet and Charlie Parker.

Osterwald led the house band at the Red Onion, an Aspen eatery, in the early 1970s. He died in 2012 at age 90.

References
Rainer E. Lotz, "Hazy Osterwald". The New Grove Dictionary of Jazz. 2nd edition, ed. Barry Kernfeld.

1922 births
2012 deaths
Swiss jazz bandleaders
Swiss jazz trumpeters
Swiss jazz vibraphonists